Josip Horvat (18 February 1904 – 2 June 1945) was a Croatian painter.

Horvat was born to Dragutin and Marija Horvat in Čakovec. He attended elementary school in Čakovec, and grade school in Nagykanizsa and Pest. He then attended the Academy of Fine Arts Vienna from 1917 to 1923.

Life and work
He started working in Zagreb in 1924, supported by patron Antun Ullrich, and worked there until his death, shortly after the Second World War. Having been accused of collaboration with authorities of the Independent State of Croatia, he was executed by the Yugoslav Partisans, without trial. The place of his burial is unknown.

Josip Horvat illustrated the following books:

 Dragutin Nemet: "Prince Zoran"
 Mark Šeparović: "Croatian history grandfather granddaughter"
 Milutin Majer: "Tatars in Croatia"

He also illustrated novels Marija Jurić Zagorka coming out in installments in Jutarnji list 1929 to 1931.

Exhibitions 
Art Pavilion in Zagreb 16.-30. XI. 1928.;
Drawing room Ullrich 25. XI. – 4. XII. 1936.;
Drawing room Ullrich 16.-28. II. 1941.;
Strossmayerova galerija 22. VII. – 11. VIII. 1942 "Pictorial impressions from battlefield";
Art Pavilion in Zagreb 22. XI. – 13. XII. 1942.  "II Exhibitions Croatian arts in the Independent State of Croatia";
Art Pavilion in Zagreb 10. – 31. X. 1943. "III Exhibitions Croatian arts in the Independent State of Croatia";
Art Pavilion in Zagreb 17. VI. – 9. VII. 1944. "IV Exhibitions Croatian arts in the Independent State of Croatia".

Exhibitions after death

Historical painting in Croatia", Zagreb 1969.  (Picture "Coronation of Croatian king Tomislav", 1938., Croatian Historical Museum)
Towns and countryside on pictures and drawing from 1800. to 1940", Zagreb 1977. (Picture "Old Town Sisak", 1944. Study for picture overview battle with Sisak, Croatian Historical Museum)

Selected works

External links
 
 Overview of some of the Horvat's paintings
 Horvat – one of the most famous Croatian patriotic painters

Croatian illustrators
20th-century Croatian people
1945 deaths
1904 births
Academy of Fine Arts Vienna alumni
20th-century Croatian painters
Croatian male painters
People from Čakovec
People killed by Yugoslav Partisans
Executed Yugoslav collaborators with Nazi Germany
History of Čakovec
20th-century Croatian male artists